The 2009–10 season of Bayern Munich began on 1 July with their first training session, led by the team's new head coach Louis van Gaal. After several friendlies the first competitive game was a cup game on 1 August. The league started on 8 August.

Bayern made several squad changes, signing Alexander Baumjohann, Edson Braafheid, Mario Gómez, Ivica Olić, Danijel Pranjić and Anatoliy Tymoshchuk. Andreas Görlitz returned to Munich after a two-year loan spell at Karlsruher SC, while Bayern declined the option to buy Massimo Oddo, who returned from loan to Milan. Tim Borowski was sold to his former club, Werder Bremen, and Lúcio left the club for Inter Milan. Zé Roberto signed at Hamburger SV after his contract with Bayern was not renewed. Just before the end of the summer transfer period, Bayern acquired Arjen Robben from Real Madrid.

In the winter transfer period, Bayern loaned both Breno and Andreas Ottl to 1. FC Nürnberg in the hopes of the duo earning first-team experience. After some quarrels with coach Van Gaal, Luca Toni moved to Roma, also on loan. Alexander Baumjohann was signed by his first club, Schalke, and Bayern loaned Edson Braafheid to Celtic in a last minute deal before the end of the winter transfer period. The Reds did not buy any new players themselves, but gave professional contracts to Diego Contento and Mehmet Ekici from Bayern II.

Bayern helped ensure they won the championship on 1 May, by winning on the penultimate gameday of the Bundesliga. In the last game, their rivals Schalke 04, who were at the time in second place, would have had to overcome a three-point and 17-goal lead to supplant the Reds. Bayern was formally awarded the trophy after the final game of the season on 8 May. A week later they also won the cup, defeating Werder Bremen 4–0 in the final. In the final game of the season, Bayern lost the Champions League final to Inter Milan 0–2.

Course of the season

Pre-season 

After the sacking of coach Jürgen Klinsmann late in the previous season, Jupp Heynckes had taken over as caretaker coach until the end of the season. It was thus that Bayern had to find a replacement in the summer break. Their choice fell on the Dutch Louis van Gaal, who had just led AZ Alkmaar to a championship in his home country. The signing of Van Gaal was in stark contrast to the signing of Klinsmann before the previous season, as Klinsmann came with absolutely no experience at club level while Van Gaal had been working as a coach in club football for almost 20 years. His quality as a coach was further underlined by the titles he had already won.

Before Van Gaal's arrival, the club had already signed Mario Gómez for a Bundesliga record sum of €35 million, as well as Anatoliy Tymoshchuk, Ivica Olić and Alexander Baumjohann. Finally, Andreas Görlitz returned on loan from Karlsruher SC. Van Gaal then encouraged the recruitment of Danijel Pranjić and Edson Braafheid. On the outgoing side, the loanee Massimo Oddo returned to Milan, Tim Borowski was sold to his former club Werder Bremen, Lúcio left for Inter Milan after many successful years with the Reds, and Zé Roberto signed with Hamburger SV when he could not agree with Bayern on a new contract.

The pre-season began with a score of friendlies which had been arranged still under the reign of Klinsmann. While Van Gaal was not happy with the packed schedule, as he preferred to work with the team, Bayern played a mostly successful preseason, including several high wins against opponents from lower tiers. They also managed to win in their own Audi Cup for which they had invited international premier clubs Milan, Manchester United, and Boca Juniors. Van Gaal waited until after the last friendly to decide on two key roles in his team. In the previous season, Klinsmann had first chosen Michael Rensing as keeper of choice, but in the second half of the season, he switched to Hans-Jörg Butt after a string of unsatisfactory games. The other important issue was that of the team captain and his replacements. On the day prior to the first competitive game of the season, the cup match at Neckarelz, the coach announced his decisions. Mark van Bommel stayed captain and Philipp Lahm became his first replacement. Van Gaal had also announced that the keeper he elected for the Neckarelz game would be his keeper of choice for the season, and in the cup game, it was Rensing who had the starting position as goalkeeper.

August– December 

In their first game, Bayern did not shine, but put away the underdogs from Neckarelz 3–1. The first games in the league were draws against 1899 Hoffenheim and Werder Bremen, before Bayern lost their first game to newly promoted Mainz 05. Just before the next Bundesliga match, Bayern announced that they had signed Arjen Robben in a last minute transfer from Real Madrid. In his first game, against VfL Wolfsburg a day later, Robben scored twice, but after a string of victories, including a 3–0 victory away at Maccabi Haifa in the starter of the Champions League, Bayern began to struggle. A loss at Hamburger SV and a draw at home against 1. FC Köln saw the Reds to the eighth place in the league, marking the worst start in decades, and the media already speculated about an even quicker sacking of Van Gaal than that of Klinsmann the previous season.

Although the draw at Köln would eventually be the start of a series of 19 undefeated games in the league, Bayern won only two of their next five league games, drawing the other three. Meanwhile, they lost twice to Bordeaux in the Champions League. This led to a configuration where Bayern could not make it to the knockout phase without the help of Bordeaux. As Bordeaux already secured qualification to the knockout phase, many expected that they would not put all their effort into their next match against Juventus, and a win of the Italians would mean the end of Bayern's Champions League campaign this season.

The Reds won their last four league matches before the winter break, and also managed to win at Haifa while Bordeaux indeed defeated Juventus, meaning that Bayern and Juventus decided who qualified for the next round face to face in the final match of the group stage. The Germans needed to win, while the Italians would be through with a draw. When David Trezeguet put Juventus in front in the 19th minute, prospects looked bleak for Bayern, but they managed to turn the game around and eventually won 4–1.

January – May 

After the winter break, Bayern won game after game. Five in the league completed a streak of nine consecutive victories while Fiorentina was put away 2–1 in the first leg of the Champions League round of 16, and second-tier SpVgg Greuther Fürth was run over 6–2 in the cup.

On 20 February 1. FC Nürnberg managed a draw against Bayern, thus ending their streak of victories, but on the following day of play a victory of the Reds at Hamburg saw them to the top of the standings for the first time in more than 18 months. A draw at Cologne and a victory against SC Freiburg completed Bayern's streak of 19 undefeated games in the league. On 9 March at Fiorentina, the club also reached the next round of the Champions League although their first loss after the winter break, 3–2, meant that they advanced only on the away goals rule.

Despite a loss at Eintracht Frankfurt on 20 March, Bayern stayed in first place, but that was of minor importance as the deciding weeks were yet to come. Within three weeks Bayern was to play in the semi-final of the cup against Schalke 04, in the league against their direct rivals, Schalke and Leverkusen, and the best team in the second leg of the league, VfB Stuttgart. In the Champions League the club faced Manchester. Bayern won the first of the matches at Schalke, the cup semi-final, in a close game after extra time. Three days later a loss at home against Stuttgart set the Reds back into second place in the league. Yet another three days later Bayern won the first leg of their quarter-final encounter with Manchester United. For the next game the club returned to Schalke where they won again, thus reclaiming their lead in the league. In the second leg the quarter-final at Manchester Bayern was down by two early, but managed to get back into the game. Eventually they won by the same score as in the previous round, 2–1 and 2–3, to advance to the semi-final. The final game of these weeks was their away game at Leverkusen where the Reds were able to claim a draw.

Next Hannover 96 was stomped 7–0, but otherwise the Reds did not have time to take breath. The first game of their semi-final against Lyon was a heated affair with red cards on both sides, but Bayern emerged victorious. Before going to Lyon for the second leg, Bayern had to face their classic rival, Mönchengladbach, in the league. A 1–1 let Bayern stay ahead of Schalke. Then the game at Lyon was all Ivica Olić's. The Croat put three past Lyon and Bayern advanced to their first Champions League final since their triumph in 2001.

With only four games left Bayern could still win the Treble, but they had not claimed a single title yet. On 1 May, Bayern defeated VfL Bochum in the league, thus putting the title out of Schalke's reach. Officially Bayern were not champions yet, but even if Schalke won on the last day while Bayern lost they would still have to do that by a result that was by 17 goals better than Bayern's. Unsurprisingly, the title went to Munich as Bayern won their last game whereas Schalke didn't. A week later Bayern faced another of their continuous rivals, Werder Bremen, in the cup final. The result was one of the most lopsided in the history of German cup finals as the Reds won 4–0. Only the most prestigious title was elusive as Bayern could not overcome Inter in the final of the Champions League.

Post-season 

Bayern had no post-season friendlies this year, but eleven players where internationals of teams that had qualified for the 2010 FIFA World Cup. Franck Ribéry joined the French World Cup squad, Martín Demichelis the Argentinian. Arjen Robben and Mark van Bommel were part of the Dutch squad and seven players, Butt, Lahm, Badstuber, Schweinsteiger, Klose, Müller, and Gómez, were called up for Germany. Butt replaced Adler who missed due to injury. Lahm became captain of the team as Ballack also missed the tournament due to injury.

Annual General Meeting

On 30 November 2010, Bayern Munich reported to their members regarding the period between 1 July 2009 and 30 June 2010. There was a unanimous approval of a series of detailed amendments to the club's constitution. Any sale of shares in FC Bayern München AG taking the total in outside hands to more than 30% of the stock will now require the approval of a 75% majority at the AGM. Bayern Munich considered their 2009–10 season a success on the field. Bayern Munich made a profit for the 18th year in a row. There were no elections to club offices this year. 2,807 club members attended the Annual General Meeting at Olympiahalle in Munich.

Bundesliga

Matches

DFB-Pokal 

As determined by the seeding on 27 June 2009 Bayern's 2009–10 DFB-Pokal campaign began on 2 August 2009 with an away match at Neckarelz. Having defeated Rot-Weiß Oberhausen, Eintracht Frankfurt, and SpVgg Greuther Fürth in the following rounds, Bayern visited Schalke 04 in the semi-final on 24 March 2010. They won in extra time to face Werder Bremen who fell to the league champions by 4 goals.

UEFA Champions League 

Bayern qualified for the group stage of the Champions League with a second place Bundesliga finish in 2008–09. Bayern was drawn in Group A with Italian runner-up Juventus, French Champions Bordeaux, and Israeli Champions Maccabi Haifa. Following a second-placed finish in Group A, Bayern advanced to face the Italian side Fiorentina, who had won Group E.

Group stage

Knockout phase

Round of 16

Quarter-finals

Semi-finals

Final

Friendlies

T-Home-Cup 

The official league cup again was not held this season. Instead Bayern participated in the T-Home Cup on 18–19 July in Gelsenkirchen. The other contestants were Schalke, Hamburg, and Stuttgart. Matches in the tournament are played with halves of 30 minutes only.

Audi Cup 

Bayern hosted the inaugural Audi Cup on 29–30 July in Munich to celebrate their partner Audi's 100th anniversary. The invited opponents were Milan, Boca Juniors, and Manchester United. Bayern won the tournament by defeating Milan in the semi-final and Manchester United on penalties in the final.

Other 

The friendly at Salzburg was also the farewell game for former Bayern midfielder Niko Kovač, who played from 2001 to 2003 for Bayern and from 2006 to 2009 for Salzburg.

The fanclub "De rodn Waginga" won the right to host the annual Dream Game, a game Bayern contests against one of its fanclubs with the earnings going to charity. In the second half the fanclub members left the field to the local club TSV Waging.

This match was dedicated to the memory of former Kickers president Axel Dünnwald-Metzler.

This was the first match with Lukas Podolski starting for Köln again. After a three-year stay at Bayern Podolski had returned to his home club Köln in summer 2009.

The match was a benefit match. McFit, a chain of fitness studios, had paid €1 million for the match in an action favoring the Ein Herz für Kinder foundation. The McFit team was captained by Oliver Pocher and included other German celebrities like Johannes B. Kerner. Also a few former professional footballers like Mario Basler, Ebbe Sand, and Thomas Häßler complemented the amateur squad.

NFV Gelb-Weiß Görlitz is the youth club of former Bayern midfielder Jens Jeremies. Bayern played against Görlitz for a friendly on the occasion of their centenary.

The game was held to celebrate the 375th anniversary of Bayern's partner and Munich based brewery Paulaner.

Bayern arranged this friendly game to give Mark van Bommel, Luca Toni, and Martín Demichelis some practice after their injuries. Demichelis was called up for the Argentina national team, though.

This game against the U-20 Netherlands national team was arranged to give some players match practice who had played few or no competitive matches at the time like Lell, Breno, or Rensing.

Bayern organized this friendly to give some of their players, especially Ribéry, additional match practice.

Players

Squad information

Transfers in 

Total spending:  €79.7 million

Transfers out 

Total income:  €22.95 million

Individual statistics 

|-
|colspan="14"|Players sold or loaned out after the start of the season:

|}

Goals

Bookings 

According to a statistic of the German football magazine Kicker Bayern was the fairest team in the 2009–10 Bundesliga.

Management and coaching staff 

Bayern had to change their coaching staff after the 2008–09 season as former head coach Jürgen Klinsmann was sacked during the season and his successor, Jupp Heynckes, was appointed as an interim only. With Klinsmann a few of the assistants he had brought in were dismissed. Louis van Gaal was hired as the new manager and took over on 1 July 2009. He brought some personnel of his own to the club.

References

External links 
FC Bayern Munich Official Website in English
UEFA Website
2009–10 FC Bayern Munich season at ESPN

FC Bayern Munich seasons
Bayern Munich
German football championship-winning seasons